Hygieia, also rendered Hygiea and Hygeia, may refer to:
 Hygieia, a Greek goddess of health
 10 Hygiea, the fourth-largest asteroid
 Hygeia (city), a planned utopian community on the Ohio River
 Bowl of Hygieia, the universally accepted sign of pharmacy
 Mount Hygeia, an historic farm in Foster, Rhode Island
 Hygieia, the name of one of the Hesperides

See also
 Hygia, a large genus of Asian seed bugs
 Hygiea (disambiguation)
 Hygiene, a series of practices performed to preserve health